Massachusetts House of Representatives' 7th Worcester district in the United States is one of 160 legislative districts included in the lower house of the Massachusetts General Court. It covers part of Worcester County. Republican Paul Frost of Auburn has represented the district since 1997.

Towns represented
The district includes the following localities:
 Auburn
 part of Charlton
 Millbury
 part of Oxford

The current district geographic boundary overlaps with those of the Massachusetts Senate's 2nd Worcester district, Worcester and Norfolk district, and Worcester, Hampden, Hampshire and Middlesex district.

Former locales
The district previously covered:
 Berlin, circa 1872 
 Clinton, circa 1872 
 Northboro, circa 1872

Representatives
 John E. Fry, circa 1858 
 George E. Burt, circa 1859 
 Charles Haggerty, circa 1888 
 John F. Freeland, circa 1920 
 Frank Haskell Allen, circa 1951 
 Robert D. McNeil, circa 1975 
 Paul K. Frost, 1997-current

See also
 List of Massachusetts House of Representatives elections
 Other Worcester County districts of the Massachusetts House of Representatives: 1st, 2nd, 3rd, 4th, 5th, 6th, 8th, 9th, 10th, 11th, 12th, 13th, 14th, 15th, 16th, 17th, 18th
 Worcester County districts of the Massachusett Senate: 1st, 2nd; Hampshire, Franklin and Worcester; Middlesex and Worcester; Worcester, Hampden, Hampshire and Middlesex; Worcester and Middlesex; Worcester and Norfolk
 List of Massachusetts General Courts
 List of former districts of the Massachusetts House of Representatives

Images

References

External links
 Ballotpedia
  (State House district information based on U.S. Census Bureau's American Community Survey).

House
Government in Worcester County, Massachusetts